The 2022 Cazoo Grand Slam of Darts, was the sixteenth staging of the Grand Slam of Darts, organised by the Professional Darts Corporation. The event took place at the Aldersley Leisure Village, Aldersley, Wolverhampton, 12–20 November 2022.

Gerwyn Price was the defending champion, after defeating Peter Wright 16–8 in the 2021 final, but he was eliminated by Raymond van Barneveld, losing 16–13 in their quarter-final.

Michael Smith won his first major title, defeating Nathan Aspinall 16–5 in the final. It was the first time the tournament had been won by an Englishman since 2014, when it was won by Phil Taylor.

Josh Rock, who made his debut, hit a nine-dart finish during his second-round defeat to Michael van Gerwen.

Prize money

The prize fund for the Grand Slam increased by £100,000 to £650,000.

Qualification 
The qualification criteria were slightly altered again for the 2022 tournament, with no representation from the World Darts Federation.

The qualifiers are:

PDC Qualifying Tournaments 

If the list of qualifiers from the main tournaments produced fewer than the required number of players (16), the field will be filled from the reserve lists. The first list consisted of the winners from 2022 European Tour events, in which the winners were ordered firstly by number of wins, then by Order of Merit position order at the cut-off date.

If there are still not enough qualifiers after European Tour events are added, the winners of 2022 Players Championship events will be added, firstly in order by number of wins, then in Order of Merit order.

PDC Qualifying Event 
A further eight places in the Grand Slam of Darts were filled by qualifiers from a PDC Tour Card Holder qualifier held on 6 November in Barnsley.

These are the qualifiers:

Additional Qualifiers 
The winners of these tournaments and tours also qualified for the tournament.

Draw
The draw was done by PDC executive Matt Porter on 7 November.

Pools
{| class="wikitable"
|-
!width=220|Pool A
!width=220|Pool B
!width=220|Pool C
!width=220|Pool D
|-
!(Seeded Players)
!colspan=3|(Qualifiers)
|-
| vstyle="text-align:top"|
 (1)
 (2)
 (3) 
 (4)
 (5) 
 (6) (7) (8)'| valign="top"|

| valign="top"|

| vstyle="text-align:top"|

|}

Group stageAll group matches are best of nine legs  After three games, the top two in each group qualify for the knock-out stage''

NB: P = Played; W = Won; L = Lost; LF = Legs for; LA = Legs against; +/− = Plus/minus record, in relation to legs; Pts = Points; Status = Qualified to knockout stage

Group A

12 November

13 November

14 November

Group B 

12 November

13 November

14 November

Group C 

12 November

13 November

14 November

Group D 

12 November

13 November

14 November

Group E 

12 November

13 November

15 November

Group F 

12 November

13 November

15 November

Group G 

12 November

13 November

15 November

Group H 

12 November

13 November

15 November

Knockout stage

Top averages
The table lists all players who achieved an average of at least 100 in a match. In the case one player has multiple records, this is indicated by the number in brackets.

References

External links 
Official website

2022
Grand Slam
Grand Slam of Darts
Grand Slam of Darts